Tom C. Lubensky (born Kansas City, Missouri 7 May 1943) is an American physicist. He is currently the Christopher H. Browne Distinguished Professor at the University of Pennsylvania, where he was Mary Amanda Wood professor of physics (1998–2009) and chair of the Department of Physics and Astronomy.

Biography
Dr. Lubensky received his B.S. in Physics from the California Institute of Technology in 1964 and both his M.A. (1965) and Ph.D. (1969) in Physics from Harvard University. He was an NSF Postdoctoral Fellow at the University of Paris in Orsay (1969–70) and a postdoctoral Research Associate at Brown University (1970–71). He joined the University of Pennsylvania in 1971, promoted to associate professor in 1975 and to full professor in 1980.

Memberships
He is a fellow of the American Physical Society (1985), American Association for the Advancement of Science (2000), elected member of the National Academy of Sciences (2002) and the American Academy of Arts and Sciences (2007), Alfred P. Sloan Fellow (1975–77), Guggenheim Fellow (1981), and honored member of the International Liquid Crystal Society.

Awards
In 2004 Dr. Lubensky received Oliver E. Buckley Condensed Matter Prize for seminal contributions to the theory of condensed matter systems including the prediction and elucidation of the properties of new, partially ordered phases of complex materials. Lubensky also was named to the Patricia M. Williams Term Chair at the University of Pennsylvania from 1995 to 1998.

Books

Lubensky is the coauthor of the textbook Principles of Condensed Matter Physics with Paul Chaikin.

References 

1943 births
Living people
People from Kansas City, Missouri
California Institute of Technology alumni
Harvard University alumni
University of Paris alumni
Brown University staff
21st-century American physicists
University of Pennsylvania faculty
Members of the United States National Academy of Sciences
Fellows of the American Association for the Advancement of Science
Fellows of the American Physical Society
Oliver E. Buckley Condensed Matter Prize winners